"I've Heard That Song Before" is a 1942 American popular song about nostalgia with music by Jule Styne and lyrics by Sammy Cahn. It was introduced by Martha O'Driscoll (dubbed by Margaret Whiting) in the 1942 film Youth on Parade. The song was nominated for the Academy Award for Best Original Song in 1942 but lost out to “White Christmas”.

It was recorded by Harry James and his Orchestra with Helen Forrest on vocal on July 31, 1942.  This was the last day of recording before the Musician Union's ban.  The recording was issued on Columbia 36668 and became a number one hit on both the pop charts and the Harlem Hit Parade in the US in early 1943. This version of the song can be heard in Woody Allen's 1986 movie Hannah and Her Sisters.

Recorded versions

Paul Anka
Joe Battaglia
Louie Bellson
Sathima Bea Benjamin
Pat Boone
Sammy Cahn
King Cole Trio
Bing Crosby (for his album Bing Crosby's Treasury - The Songs I Love (1968 version))
Sammy Davis Jr.
Michael Feinstein
Benny Green
Urbie Green
Al Hirt
Dolores Hope
Harry James and his orchestra (vocal: Helen Forrest)
Steve Lawrence
Hal Linden
Vera Lynn
Andrea Marcovicci
Al Martino
Audrey Morris
Frank Sinatra
Freddie Slack
The Spitfire Band
Starsound Orchestra
Mel Tormé
Allison Lerer
Wesla Whitfield
Margaret Whiting
Russ Williams
Scott Wright

Sources
Jacobs, Dick & Jacobs, Harriet:  Who Wrote That Song?  Writer's Digest Books, 2nd Edition 1992

References

Songs about nostalgia
Songs about music
1942 songs
1943 singles
Songs written for films
Songs with music by Jule Styne
Songs with lyrics by Sammy Cahn
Number-one singles in the United States